The Blandings radio series is a series of radio dramas based on the Blandings Castle stories by British comic writer P. G. Wodehouse. The stories were dramatised by Wodehouse biographer Richard Usborne. The series ran between 1985 and 1992 on BBC Radio 4.

The 1985 episodes are based on six short stories. The first five of these short stories were featured in the collection Blandings Castle and Elsewhere (1935), while the sixth, "The Crime Wave at Blandings", was collected in Lord Emsworth and Others (1937). The later episodes are based on four novels published between 1929 and 1965.

Production
The short story episodes broadcast in 1985 were produced by Bobby Jaye. Martin Fisher produced the episodes based on Summer Lightning, Pigs Have Wings and Heavy Weather, and Gareth Edwards produced the episodes based on Galahad at Blandings.

Main cast
 Narrator – Nigel Anthony (short stories), Ronald Fletcher (Summer Lightning), Moray Watson (the other novels)
 Clarence Threepwood, 9th Earl of Emsworth – Richard Vernon
 The Hon. Galahad Threepwood – Ian Carmichael
 Beach – Lockwood West (short stories), Timothy Bateson (Summer Lightning and Pigs Have Wings), John Rapley (Heavy Weather), Harold Innocent (Galahad at Blandings)
 Lady Constance Keeble – Margot Boyd (short stories), Elizabeth Spriggs (Summer Lightning, Heavy Weather), Joan Sanderson (Pigs Have Wings)
 The Hon. Frederick Threepwood – Steve Hodson
 Sir Gregory Parsloe-Parsloe – Reginald Marsh

Episode list
The seven episodes released in 1985 are based on Blandings Castle short stories, while later episodes are based on novels.

Short stories

The additional cast for the short stories included Michael Goldie as Mr Donaldson ("The Custody of the Pumpkin"), Phillada Sewell as Mrs Twemlow, Fiona Mathieson as Aggie Threepwood, Valerie Colgan as Jane Yorke ("Lord Emsworth Grows a Beard"), Peter Tuddenham as the magistrate, Diana Martin as Angela, and Edward Duke as James Belford ("Pig-hoo-o-o-o-ey!"), Sheila Keith as Lady Marshall, Nicholas Courtney as the Rev. Rupert "Beefy" Bingham, Wendy Murray as Gertrude ("Company for Gertrude"), Susanna Dawson as Gladys ("Lord Emsworth and the Girlfriend"), Helen Atkinson-Wood as Jane, Michael McClain as Baxter ("The Crime Wave at Blandings") and Henry Stamper as McAllister.

Summer Lightning
Adapted from Summer Lightning (1929). In addition to the regular cast, the cast included Graham Seed as Ronnie Fish, Royce Mills as Hugo Carmody, Wendy Murray as Millicent, Susannah Fellows as Sue Brown, 
Christopher Godwin as Baxter, and Roger Sloman as Pilbeam.

Heavy Weather
Adapted from Heavy Weather (1933). Additional actors included John Savident as Lord Tilbury, Josephine Tewson as Lady Julia, Royce Mills as Monty Bodkin, Jeremy Nicholas as Hugo, Charles Collingwood as Ronnie Fish, Moir Leslie as Sue Brown, Norman Bird as Pirbright, and Roger Sloman as Pilbeam.

Pigs Have Wings
Adapted from Pigs Have Wings (1952). Additional cast included Joan Sims as Maudie Digby, Susannah Fellows as Penny Donaldson, Royce Mills as Jerry Vail, Charles Collingwood as Orlo Vosper, David Graham as Binstead, and Moir Leslie as Gloria Salt.

Galahad at Blandings
Adapted from Galahad at Blandings (1964). Along with the main cast, the episodes featured Elizabeth Spriggs as Lady Hermione, Harold Innocent as Egbert as well as Beach, Jonathan Cecil as Wilfred, Alan Marriott as Tipton, Susannah Fellowes as Sandy, Simon Treves as Sam, Vivian Pickles as Daphne, Colin McFarlane as the US policeman, Moir Leslie as Monica, Richard Pearce as Huxley, and Chris Emmett as Constable Evans.

References
References

Sources
 

Adaptations of works by P. G. Wodehouse
British radio dramas
1985 radio programme debuts